Paulo Camacho (born 3 August 1970) is a Portuguese butterfly swimmer. He competed in the men's 100 metre butterfly at the 1988 Summer Olympics.

References

External links
 

1970 births
Living people
Portuguese male butterfly swimmers
Olympic swimmers of Portugal
Swimmers at the 1988 Summer Olympics
Place of birth missing (living people)
Male butterfly swimmers